Bolesław II of Niemodlin (1326/35 – by 25 June 1368), was a Duke of Niemodlin since 1365 until his death (with his brothers as co-rulers).

He was the eldest son of Bolesław the Elder, Duke of Niemodlin, by his wife Euphemia, daughter of Henry VI the Good, Duke of Wrocław.

Life
In 1355, thanks to the contacts of his father in the Prague court, Bolesław II was appointed Judge court by Emperor Charles IV.

After the death of his father by 1365, Bolesław II and his brothers inherited Niemodlin as co-rulers. He followed the politics of cooperation with the Bohemian Kingdom and in 1367 he obtain Prudnik as a hereditary fief.

Bolesław II never married or had children. He died between 1367 and 1368 and his place of burial is unknown.

Footnotes

References

Chronological Dates in Stoyan
Genealogy of the Dukes of Opole

14th-century births
1360s deaths
Piast dynasty
Dukes of Prudnik